Shamsul Huq (1918–1965) was a Bengali politician who led a parliamentary committee in the Constituent Assembly of Pakistan to advocate for the recognition of the Bengali language during the Language movement of the 1950s. He was also the first and third general secretary of the Awami League, which played a key role in Bengali nationalist movement in the 1950s and 1960s.

Political career
The Awami League was formed on 23 June 1949 and Huq became its first general secretary, and Abdul Hamid Khan Bhashani became its first president. He wrote a pamphlet on this occasion titled "Main Demands." The pamphlet reads

Personal life
Haq was married to Afia Khatun (later Afia Dil). Afia Khatun's childhood friend was Begum Jahanara Khan wife of Yar Mohammad Khan who was a founder (treasurer) of the Awami League and the founder (publisher) of The Daily Ittefaq. She currently lives and works in the United States. She has authored a book – Bengali Language Movement and the Creation of Bangladesh (2011) – with her husband Anwar S. Dil.

References 

1918 births
1965 deaths
People from Tangail District
Awami League politicians
General Secretaries of Awami League
Pakistani politicians
20th-century Bengalis